Chen Bilan (also spelled Ch'en Pi-Lan) was a Chinese communist. Chen was one of the founders of the Chinese Trotskyist movement and was exiled in 1948. For the rest of her life, she was a leader of the exiled Chinese Trotskyists and a member of the Fourth International.

Biography
Chen was born in Huangpo, Hubei province in 1902 to a affluent family. To escape from a forced marriage, she fled to Shanghai. In 1923, Chen became a communist and joined the Chinese Communist Party. She lived in Shanghai with Cai Hesen and Xiang Jingyu. In 1924, the Central Committee of the Chinese Communist Party sent Chen, Li Dazhao, and Zhang Tailei to Moscow. She was sent to study at the Communist University of the Toilers of the East. While studying there, she was able to meet with many other members of the Chinese Communist Party and hear speeches from the leader of the Russian Communist Party (Bolsheviks) and Comintern. In the Spring of 1925, 13 labour demonstrators in Shanghai were killed by police, leading to a series of strikes and protests throughout China, and Chen subsequently travelled back to China. Back in Shanghai she became an editor under the Communist Party’s propaganda department,  which was headed by Peng Shuzhi. During this time, Peng and Chen began living together. Peng and Chen became major opponents of the party’s continued entryism in the Kuomintang.

Selected bibliography
 The New Developments in the Chinese Situation, 1969
 The Real Lesson of China on Guerrilla Warfare, 1973

References 

1902 births
1987 deaths
Delegates to the 5th National Congress of the Chinese Communist Party